Lautaro Montoya (born 7 October 1994) is an Argentine footballer who plays for Central Córdoba SdE, on loan from Estudiantes BA as a left-back.

References

External links

1994 births
Living people
Association football defenders
Argentine footballers
San Lorenzo de Almagro footballers
Chacarita Juniors footballers
Estudiantes de Buenos Aires footballers
Club Atlético Sarmiento footballers
Central Córdoba de Santiago del Estero footballers
Argentine Primera División players
Primera Nacional players
Footballers from Buenos Aires